Arka Gdynia is a Polish rugby union club located in Gdynia, Poland.

Honours 
 Ekstraliga
 Champions (4): 2004, 2005, 2011, 2015
 Runners-up (7): 2000, 2002, 2007, 2009, 2013
 Polish Cup (rugby):
Winners (1): 2010

History 
Arka Gdynia Rugby Club's  history begins in the mid-1990s. The Arka hooligans decided to start a rugby team. Forming the team and winning the "sevens" tournament in Sopot in 1996, is considered the date which the rugby section was established. Arka performances in the league began in 1997. In the 1999/2000 season, the "Bulldogs" won their first medal, and four years later was the first time they became best team in the country. They have won one other championship.

See also
Rugby union in Poland
Rugby Ekstraliga

External links 
 Official website

Arka
Arka Gdynia
1996 establishments in Poland
Sport in Gdynia